Takashi Matsuoka (born January 10, 1947) is a first-generation Japanese American writer. He lives in Honolulu, Hawaii, United States, and worked at a Zen Buddhist temple before becoming a full-time writer. His books about American missionaries' visits to Japan are often compared to Shōgun and other books by British historical novelist James Clavell. Matsuoka also worked as a writer for the 1990 film Pale Blood.

Novels
Cloud of Sparrows (2002) 
Autumn Bridge (2004)

External links
Books by Matsuoka

1947 births
Living people
20th-century American male writers
21st-century American male writers
21st-century American novelists
American male novelists
American historical novelists
American novelists of Asian descent
American writers of Japanese descent
Japanese emigrants to the United States
Writers of historical fiction set in the modern age